John Matthew Stover (born January 27, 1968) is a former American football placekicker who played in the National Football League (NFL) for 20 seasons, primarily with the Baltimore Ravens. After five seasons for the Cleveland Browns, he was among the Browns players transferred to the newly-created Ravens franchise in 1996, with whom he played 13 seasons. Additionally, Stover was a member of the New York Giants during his first season and Indianapolis Colts during his last. His most successful season was in 2000 when he earned Pro Bowl and first-team All-Pro honors en route to the Ravens winning their first Super Bowl title in Super Bowl XXXV. He was also part of the Giants team that won Super Bowl XXV. For his accomplishments with the Ravens, Stover was named to the Baltimore Ravens Ring of Honor in 2011.

Early years
Stover attended Lake Highlands High School in Dallas, Texas, the alma mater of fellow NFL placekicker Phil Dawson. Stover won All-District honors as both a wide receiver and kicker. During the 1985-86 season, he successfully kicked a 53-yard field goal. He graduated from high school in 1986.

College career
Prior to his NFL career, Stover attended Louisiana Tech University, where he was an active member of the Alpha Omega chapter of Delta Kappa Epsilon acting as vice president. He graduated from Louisiana Tech with a degree in marketing. During his college career, Stover successfully converted on 64-of-88 field goal attempts. As a sophomore, facing Texas A&M, he kicked a 57-yard field goal, then a school record. He also punted as a senior, punting 36 times for 1,277 yards (34.1 yards per punt avg). He left Louisiana Tech with 262 career total points and seven field goals of 50 yards or more.  While at Louisiana Tech, Stover would usually kick the ball through the goal posts on the first kickoff of the game. Stover currently holds the NCAA record for most punts in a single game at 16 against Louisiana-Monroe November 18, 1988.

Professional career

New York Giants
Stover was drafted by the New York Giants with the 329th selection (12th round) in the 1990 NFL Draft. He was on the injured reserve list the entire season as the Giants won Super Bowl XXV over the Buffalo Bills.

Cleveland Browns
Stover signed with the Cleveland Browns in 1991 and spent five seasons as a Brown.

Baltimore Ravens
In 1996, the Browns moved to Baltimore to become the Baltimore Ravens. Stover spent the majority of his career as a Raven. In 2000, the Ravens failed to score an offensive touchdown in five straight games, in which Stover, who was selected as a Pro Bowler, scored all the team's points. Stover received a Super Bowl ring that year when the Ravens defeated his former team, the New York Giants in Super Bowl XXXV.

Stover remained kicking with the Ravens, setting several records and kicking 18 game-winning field goals. In January 2009, Stover converted a 43-yard field goal to win against the Tennessee Titans in the AFC Divisional Round. That was Stover's last field goal as a member of the Ravens. The Ravens decided not to re-sign Stover following the 2008 season.

On November 20, 2011, Stover was inducted into the Ravens Ring of Honor, during a halftime ceremony at M&T Bank Stadium against the Cincinnati Bengals.

Indianapolis Colts
As a free agent following 2008, Stover signed with the Indianapolis Colts in the middle of the 2009 NFL season to replace the injured Adam Vinatieri, who was placed on injured reserve. In Indianapolis, Stover played in two wins against the Ravens, and helped the Colts to an appearance in Super Bowl XLIV, at age 42, which made Stover the oldest player in Super Bowl history up to that point (since surpassed by Tom Brady, who was 43 years old when he participated in Super Bowl LV). Stover converted a 38-yard field goal and two extra points in the loss to the New Orleans Saints, while also missing a 51 yard field goal in the fourth quarter. He was not re-signed by the team.

Retirement

Stover announced his retirement from professional football on May 25, 2011 with the Baltimore Ravens. At the time of his retirement, he was the last remaining member of the original Cleveland Browns still active in the NFL, and was also the last Ravens player to have played for the franchise before the team moved from Cleveland. At the time, he retired as the NFL's fourth all-time leading scorer.

Career regular season statistics
Career high/best bolded

NFL records
 NFL's sixth all-time leading scorer: 2,004 points
 Most consecutive PATs: 469
 Most consecutive games with a field goal: 38
 Most points scored by a player in his 30s: 1113
 Oldest player to score in a Super Bowl: 42 years, 11 days old

Ravens franchise records
 Most career field goals (354)

Personal life
Stover has a son, Jacob, who attended Loyola University and plays lacrosse. His daughter, Jenna, played lacrosse at Messiah College.  Stover has an older brother.

References

External links

 The Matt Stover Foundation website
 NFL kicking records
 NFL career statistics
 
 Baltimore Ravens bio

1968 births
Living people
American Conference Pro Bowl players
American football placekickers
Baltimore Ravens players
Cleveland Browns players
Indianapolis Colts players
Louisiana Tech Bulldogs football players
New York Giants players
Players of American football from Dallas